= PSR J1747−2958 =

Radio pulsar in the constellation Sagittarius

Observation data Epoch J2000 Equinox ICRS
- Constellation: Sagittarius
- Right ascension: 17^{h} 47^{m} 15.869^{s}
- Declination: −29° 58′ 00.93″

Characteristics
- Spectral type: Pulsar

Details
Rotation	98.8139764825 ms
Age	25,500 years

Other designations
- PSR J1747−2958

Database references
SIMBAD	data

PSR J1747−2958 is a young, weak, nonthermal radio pulsar with a rotation period of 98.813 milliseconds and is characteristic age of 25,500 years old. The pulsar moves at a supersonic speed through the interstellar medium forming an unusual nonthermal nebula around it. This nebula around PSR J1747−2958 is also called the "Mouse nebula" or "G359.23−0.82" and it is a axisymmetric nebula.

== Discovery ==
This object was discovered on February 7, 2008, with a 58 ks exposure.
